Just Dance 2019 is a 2018 dance rhythm game developed and published by Ubisoft. It was unveiled on June 11, 2018, during its E3 press conference as the tenth main installment of the series, and was released on October 23, 2018 on Nintendo Switch, Wii, Wii U, PlayStation 4, Xbox One and Xbox 360 in North America. It was also released on October 25, 2018 in Europe and Australia. A demo for the game was released on November 12, 2018, on Xbox One, PlayStation 4, Wii U, and Nintendo Switch.

Just Dance 2019 was the last known game overall to be released for the Xbox 360 worldwide. It was also the last Just Dance game released on the Wii U console, and by extension, the final Wii U game to be published by Ubisoft.

Gameplay

As with the previous installments of the franchise, players must mimic the on-screen dancer's choreography to a chosen song using either motion controllers or the game's associated smartphone app.

The game's user interface received a significant redesign, with a focus on recommendations and curated playlists. It merged the World Dance Floor into the main "Just Dance" mode. Support for the Just Dance Controller app was absent on the Nintendo Switch version of the game, the only such occurrence in the entire series.

Alongside of the brand new seasonal mechanic, the "World Dance Floor" mode has a brand new feature entitled seasonal points, where players earn points throughout the season.

The online features from Just Dance 2015 (the "Just Dance Wall" feature, the "challenge" feature, the online Autodance sharing feature and the "World Dance Floor" mode) were removed from the Wii, and Xbox 360 versions of the game, in which that said game was continued to be used as its basis.

Soundtrack

 
The following songs appear on Just Dance 2019:

Drake's "Nice for What" was included in initial pressings of the game, but was removed from versions on eighth generation consoles via patches shortly after the release of the game itself due to licensing issues. However, the song can still be played on the Wii and Xbox 360 versions.

Kids Mode
The following songs appear on the Kids Mode of the game:

Note: These songs also can be played on Wii and Xbox 360.

Just Dance Unlimited
Just Dance Unlimited is a subscription-based service for accessing a streaming library of songs, including new exclusives and songs from previous Just Dance games. As with all previous releases to include Unlimited, the feature is only supported on eighth-generation consoles. As of the release of 2019, all future songs added to the service will be exclusive to it.

Songs exclusive to Just Dance Unlimited include:

Reception 
Nintendo Life gave Just Dance 2019 a 7 out of 10, noting that its stripped-down experience was "a strange shift to behold, suggesting that the game is trying to adapt to a new Spotify-using, social media-loving, older teen audience, or maybe growing up alongside those who have supported it from the beginning", and also acknowledged Ubisoft's continued emphasis on pushing its subscription-based offerings for the franchise, as well as performance issues and the removal of Just Dance Controller app support on the Nintendo Switch version.

The game won the award for "Favorite Video Game" at the 2019 Kids' Choice Awards, and was nominated for "People's Choice" at the Italian Video Game Awards.

References

External links

Dance video games
Fitness games
Just Dance (video game series)
Music video games
Kinect games
PlayStation 4 games
PlayStation Move-compatible games
Nintendo Network games
Nintendo Switch games
2018 video games
Ubisoft games
Video games developed in France
Wii games
Wii U eShop games
Wii U games
Xbox 360 games
Xbox One games
Multiplayer and single-player video games